Haim Ben-David (May 6, 1919 – November 22, 1967) was a major general in the Israel Defense Forces, the second Military Secretary to Prime Minister David Ben-Gurion, and the head of the Manpower Directorate. After his military service, Ben-David was appointed ambassador to Ethiopia where he was killed in a plane accident in line of duty.

Biography 
Ben-David was born in Vienna, the capital of Austria in 1919. He studied Hebrew at the local Jewish community which was headed by Tzvi-Peretz Hayot at the time. Soon after, Ben-David joined the Gordonia, a Zionist youth movement and in 1938 he immigrated to Israel. Soon after arriving in Israel, Ben-David joined the Haganah where he aided Jewish immigrants during the Aliyah.

Ben-David became one of the first fighters in the Special Night Squads watching over the Mosul–Haifa oil pipeline in the Jezreel Valley. He eventually settled in Beit She'an valley where he became the area's first commander of Hish.

After the formation of the Carmeli Brigade on February 22, 1948, he became a company commander. During the 1948 Arab–Israeli War Ben-David fought in the Battle of Ramat Yohanan. He participated in Operation Dekel and Operation Hiram in the Western Galilee in an attempt to free Yehiam.

In October 1951, he was appointed assistant Chief of General Staff under the command of Mordechai Maklef. In 1953 he was appointed to organize the Department of Human Resources under the Manpower Directorate. In 1955 he was appointed Battalion commander of Golani Brigade, a position he held for a year.

Ben-David became the Military Secretary to the Prime Minister under the command of David Ben-Gurion following the suicide of Nehemiah Argov. He held that position for five years while the Lavon Affair intensified. Following the resignation of David Ben-Gurion in 1963, Ben-David was appointed Head of the Manpower Directorate. In April of '64 Ben-David was promoted to Aluf rank.

After his release and plane accident 

After his release from the military in 1966, Ben-David was appointed Israel's ambassador in Ethiopia. In November 1967 Ben-David was killed in a plane accident while flying from Addis Ababa to an Israeli farm as part of the Food and Agriculture Organization of the United Nations. He is buried in Kiryat Shaul Military Cemetery. Ben-David was married and had three sons.

References 

1919 births
1967 deaths
Israeli generals
Haganah members
Jewish emigrants from Austria to Mandatory Palestine after the Anschluss
Burials at Kiryat Shaul Cemetery